Salt Lake 2002 is the official video game of the XIX Olympic Winter Games, hosted by Salt Lake City, Utah, United States in 2002. Developed by Attention to Detail and published by Eidos Interactive (DC Studios/Ubi Soft for the Game Boy Advance version), it was released for Microsoft Windows, PlayStation 2 and Game Boy Advance. An Xbox version was also planned but cancelled.

Competition
There are four game modes: Olympic, Tournament, Classic and Time Trial. The Olympic Mode returns to the simplistic direct-to-competition mode, unlike Sydney 2000 that forced the player to qualify for the Olympics. Each players' victories are logged, and trophies/medals can be seen in a trophy room. Gameplay-wise, the events are unevenly done. While the downhill/slalom events are reasonably simulated and playable (one can play downhill in first person view, and at easier levels missing a gate in the slalom does not disqualify the player), in ski jump and bobsleigh results are generally hard to predict or control.

Playable nations

There is a total of 16 playable countries in the game. They are:

Events
Men's Alpine Skiing Downhill
Women's Alpine Skiing Slalom
Women's Freestyle Skiing Aerials
Men's Ski Jump K120 Individual
Men's Two-man Bobsleigh
Men's Snowboard Parallel Giant Slalom
Curling

Reception

The Game Boy Advance version of Salt Lake 2002 received "mixed" reviews, while the PC and PlayStation 2 versions received "generally unfavorable reviews", according to the review aggregation website Metacritic. In Japan, where the PS2 version was ported for release on 28 February 2002, Famitsu gave it a score of 25 out of 40.

References

External links
 
 

2002 video games
2002 Winter Olympics
Attention to Detail games
Eidos Interactive games
Ubisoft games
Cancelled Xbox games
Game Boy Advance games
PlayStation 2 games
Sports video games set in the United States
Windows games
Winter Olympic video games
Video games developed in Canada
Video games set in 2002
Video games set in Utah
Salt Lake City in fiction
DC Studios games
Multiplayer and single-player video games
Video games developed in the United Kingdom